Glacis may refer to:
 Glacis, in military engineering is an artificial slope as part of a medieval castle or in early modern fortresses. 
 Glacis, Seychelles, the district in Seychelles
Glacis United, football club in Gibraltar

See also